Hunnimeya Rathriyalli is a 1980 Indian Kannada-language film, directed by Rajasekhar and produced by R. M. Subramanyam, Radha Narayanan and Jalaja Shanmugam. The film stars Lokesh, Ashok, Roopa Chakravarthi and M. S. Vasantha. The film was remade in Telugu as Punnami Naagu, in Tamil as Pournami Nilavil and in Hindi as Jeene Ki Arzoo.

Plot

Cast 

 Lokesh
 Ashok
 Roopa Chakravarthy
 M. S. Vasantha
 Musuri Krishnamurthy
 S. V. Ramadas
 Suryakumar
 Comedian Guggu
 Babu
 Ramakrishna
 Vijayababu in Guest Appearance
 Sudha Sindhoor
 Nalini
 Saroja
 Lavanya
 Vijayalakshmi
 Rani
 Hamsarani
 Master Shashi

Soundtrack

References

External links 
 

1980s Kannada-language films
Films directed by Rajasekhar (director)
Films scored by Gangai Amaran
Kannada films remade in other languages